The Anupam Kher ShowKucch Bhi Ho Sakta Hai ('The Anupam Kher ShowAnything Can Happen') is a 2014 Indian Hindi-language talk show on Colors TV that is hosted by Anupam Kher. It features a new celebrity every week. The first actor to appear on the show was Shah Rukh Khan. The first season ended on 21 September 2014.

Second Season premiered on 2 August 2015 featuring Priyanka Chopra. The second season ended on 1 November 2015 with Kajol Devgan in finale episode.

Celebrity appearances

References

External links
 Official Page on Colors TV Website

Indian television talk shows
2014 Indian television series debuts
Colors TV original programming